The 2020 Clemson Tigers women's soccer team represents Clemson University during the 2020 NCAA Division I women's soccer season.  The Tigers are led by head coach Ed Radwanski, in his tenth season.  The Tigers home games are played at Riggs Field.  This is the team's 27th season playing organized soccer.  All of those seasons were played in the Atlantic Coast Conference.

Due to the COVID-19 pandemic, the ACC played a reduced schedule in 2020 and the NCAA Tournament was postponed to 2021.  The ACC did not play a spring league schedule, but did allow teams to play non-conference games that would count toward their 2020 record in the lead up to the NCAA Tournament.

The Tigers finished the fall season 6–4–0, 5–3–0 in ACC play to finish in fourth place.  As the fourth seed in the ACC Tournament, they lost to Duke 1–0 in the Quarterfinals.  The Tigers finished the spring season 6–0–0 and received an at-large bid as the fourteenth seed in the NCAA Tournament.  They defeated Rutgers and UCLA on penalties before losing to Santa Clara in the Quarterfinals to end their season.

Previous season

The 2019 Clemson women's soccer team finished the season with a 11–7–2 overall record and a 5–5–0 ACC record. The Tigers qualified for the ACC Tournament as the seventh-seed.  The Tigers lost to Florida State in the Quarterfinals.  The Tigers earned an at-large bid into the 2019 NCAA Division I Women's Soccer Tournament, for the seventh season in a row. As an unseeded team in the Florida State Bracket, Clemson defeated Vanderbilt on penalties before losing to UCLA to end their season.

Offseason

Departures

Recruiting Class

Squad

Roster

Updated September 11, 2020

Prior to the season, Sydney Dawson, Renee Guion, and Kimber Haley were named co-captains of the team

Team management

Source:

Schedule

Source:

|-
!colspan=6 style=""| Fall Regular season

|-
!colspan=6 style=""| ACC Tournament

|-
!colspan=6 style=""| Spring Exhibition

|-
!colspan=6 style=""| Spring Regular season

|-
!colspan=6 style=""| NCAA Tournament

Goals Record

Disciplinary record

Awards and honors

Rankings

Fall 2020

Spring 2021

2021 NWSL draft

The Tigers had one player drafted in the 2021 draft, Mariana Speckmaier, who taken as the 39th pick.

References

External links

Clemson
Clemson Women's Soccer
Clemson
2020